George Mish Marsden (born 1939) is an American  historian who has written extensively on the interaction between Christianity and American culture, particularly on Christianity in American higher education and on American evangelicalism. He is best known for his award-winning biography of the New England clergyman Jonathan Edwards, a prominent theologian of Colonial America.

Biography
Marsden was born on February 25, 1939, in Harrisburg, Pennsylvania. He attended Haverford College, Westminster Theological Seminary, and Yale University, completing a Doctor of Philosophy degree in American history under Sydney E. Ahlstrom.  He taught at Calvin College (1965–1986), Duke Divinity School (1986–1992), and as Francis A. McAnaney Professor of History at the University of Notre Dame (1992–2008). As of 2017 Marsden is Emeritus Professor of History at the University of Notre Dame. His former doctoral students include Diana Butler Bass, Matthew Grow, Thomas S. Kidd, Steven Nolt, and Rick Ostrander.

He was awarded the Bancroft Prize for his book Jonathan Edwards: A Life in 2004, the Merle Curti Award in 2004, and the Grawemeyer Award in Religion in 2005.

Selected works

References

Footnotes

Bibliography

 
 
 

1939 births
20th-century American historians
American male non-fiction writers
20th-century Calvinist and Reformed Christians
21st-century American historians
21st-century American male writers
21st-century Calvinist and Reformed Christians
American Calvinist and Reformed Christians
American evangelicals
American historians of religion
Calvin University faculty
Duke Divinity School faculty
Harvard Divinity School faculty
Haverford College alumni
Historians from Pennsylvania
History of the Thirteen Colonies
Intellectual historians
Living people
Presidents of the American Society of Church History
University of Notre Dame faculty
Westminster Theological Seminary alumni
Yale University alumni
Bancroft Prize winners
20th-century American male writers